Mustafar is a fictional volcanic and lava planet in the Star Wars franchise. Introduced in the final prequel film, Revenge of the Sith (2005), it also appeared in the films Rogue One (2016) and Episode IX – The Rise of Skywalker (2019). The lava planet consists largely of volcanic environments, featuring lava rivers and active volcanoes. It is mostly remembered for the role it played in Revenge of the Sith, being the site of a climactic lightsaber duel between Obi-Wan Kenobi and his former pupil, Darth Vader, which resulted in the latter's disfiguration and need of life support. The planet also featured in various spin-off media, including the VR game Vader Immortal: A Star Wars VR Series (2019), which reveals that Mustafar used to be a forested planet, and explores the origins of its current state.

Development 
While franchise creator George Lucas was writing the sequels of the original Star Wars trilogy, he outlined the backstory that would eventually be seen in the prequel trilogy, including the climactic duel between Jedi Master Obi-Wan Kenobi and Sith Lord Darth Vader (formerly Kenobi's pupil, Anakin Skywalker). In the novelization of Return of the Jedi, Obi-Wan recounts his battle with Anakin, stating that the latter "fell into a molten pit". 

During the pre-production of Revenge of the Sith, Steven Spielberg was brought in as a "guest director" to make suggestions to the art designers for the duel scene. He suggested that Anakin and Obi-Wan should be "dripping sweat" and that "their hair at some point should be smoking", which Lucas loved. While the film was in production, Mount Etna erupted in Italy. Camera crews were sent to the location to shoot several angles of the volcano that were later spliced into the background of the film; 910 artists created 49 seconds of footage for the duel over 70,441 man hours.

In the anthology film Rogue One, Vader is depicted as having his personal headquarters on Mustafar. In creating the design for Vader's fortress, the film's developers drew inspiration from a Ralph McQuarrie concept painting from the original trilogy depicting Emperor Palpatine enthroned over a lava lake.

Appearances 
In Revenge of the Sith, following Count Dooku's death near the end of the Clone Wars, Palpatine orders General Grievous to send the remaining Separatist leaders into hiding on Mustafar (sparsely inhabited by creatures such as Mustafarians). Once Palpatine achieves his goal of transforming the Galactic Republic into the Galactic Empire, he orders his new apprentice, Darth Vader, to assassinate them in a conclusive act of the war. Shortly after the Separatist leaders' deaths, Vader is confronted by his former mentor, Obi-Wan Kenobi, with whom he engages in a fierce lightsaber duel. Vader is left to die on the banks of a volcano, but Palpatine rescues him and places him in a cybernetic suit to keep him alive.

In Rogue One, it is revealed that Vader has built a stronghold, Fortress Vader, on Mustafar, which serves as his personal headquarters during the reign of the Empire. Fortress Vader makes a brief appearance in the film during Vader's meeting with Director Orson Krennic.

In The Rise of Skywalker, set over three decades later, Vader's grandson, Kylo Ren, retrieves a Sith wayfinder from the ruins of Fortress Vader. The setting is not made explicit in the film itself, as it looks different from its earlier appearances. This change is explained in the VR game series Vader Immortal, which reveals that the planet was originally lush and forested, before becoming volcanic and almost lifeless during an ancient battle. During the events of the game, the player character restores Mustafar to its original state, but the planet will take several centuries to be completely healed. By the time of The Rise of Skywalker, only a few changes have occurred, such as the appearance of iron trees.

Mustafar also makes brief appearances in the animated television series The Clone Wars and Rebels. In the spin-off comics Tales from Vader's Castle (2018) and Return to Vader's Castle (2019), published by IDW Publishing, Fortress Vader serves as the location for a Halloween-themed anthology series of horror stories.

Fortress Vader is also seen in the live-action streaming mini-series Obi-Wan Kenobi (2022).

See also
 List of Star Wars planets and moons

References

External links 
 
 

Star Wars planets
Fictional terrestrial planets